Rhapsa scotosialis, the slender owlet moth, is a moth of the family Noctuidae. This species is endemic to New Zealand and is found throughout the country. It is regarded as one of the most common forest moths found in New Zealand. The larval host species for R. scotosialis is Piper excelsum.

Taxonomy
This species was first described by Francis Walker in 1866 from specimens collected in Nelson by T. R. Oxley. It was also described by Arthur Gardiner Butler in 1877 using the name Herminia lilacina. This latter name was subsequently synonymised by Edward Meyrick in 1887. In both 1898 and 1928 George Hudson discussed and illustrated this species in his books New Zealand moths and butterflies (Macro-lepidoptera) and The butterflies and moths of New Zealand. The male holotype specimen is held at the Natural History Museum, London.

Description
The adults of this species were described by George Hudson as follows:

Both the male and female are variable in the depth of colour and newly emerged specimens can have a purplish tinge to their forewings.

Distribution and habitat
This species is endemic to New Zealand and can be found throughout the country.  It inhabits native forest and is one of the most common forest moths found in New Zealand.

Life stages
The eggs of R. scotosialis are round and slightly flattened on their underside and are either grey blue or yellow when freshly laid and turn a dull purple colour after a couple of days. It takes approximately 20 days before the larvae emerge. The caterpillar has a brown head and a white body. When fully grown the larva is a deep brown colour and is slightly over 1 inch in length. Each segment of the body of the caterpillar has a small round protuberance from which come a tuft of hairs. The larva pupates in a cocoon hidden in leaf litter on soil.

Behaviour 
The larvae of this species are difficult to observe as they move infrequently during the day. Adults are on the wing throughout the year. They are night flying but can be disturbed during the day by beating the dead fronds of tree ferns. They are attracted to light and can be observed at night feeding on white rata blossoms.

Host species

A host species for the larvae of R. scotosialis is Piper excelsum. The larvae are also known to feed on fallen leaves of various native trees as well as on Pinus radiata.

References 

Calpinae
Moths of New Zealand
Moths described in 1859
Endemic fauna of New Zealand
Taxa named by Francis Walker (entomologist)
Endemic moths of New Zealand